HAMSAT also known as HAMSAT INDIA, VU2SAT and VO-52 is a microsatellite weighing , providing amateur radio satellite communications services for Indian and international amateur radio operators. This satellite carries the in-orbit designation of VO-52, and is an OSCAR series satellite.

History
It was launched by PSLV-C6 on May 5, 2005. The main payload was an Indian Remote Sensing satellite, CARTOSAT-1 weighing . HAMSAT was placed into a polar sun synchronous orbit.

It carries two transponders, one built by William Leijenaar (Call Sign: PE1RAH), a Dutch Radio Amateur and graduate engineering student from the Higher Technical Institute at Venlo and the other by Ham enthusiasts with help from the ISRO (Indian Space Research Organisation). Each transponder is recognized by its beacon. The Indian transponder has an unmodulated carrier on 145.940 MHz. The Dutch transponder is modulated with telemetry information on 145.860 MHz. Both are linear transponders offering the CW, SSB and FM modes of amateur radio communication. They operate Mode-B for U-V operation with UHF uplink and VHF downlink.

The satellite joins many previous satellites in amateur radio service; mostly launched by AMSAT.

HAMSAT VO-52 failed in Space on 11 July 2014, while on its 49,675th orbit, due to the failure of on-board lithium ion batteries that have met their end of life. Although the satellite's systems and sub-systems are working normal as per the latest telemetry received, the on-board computer recurring to ‘Reset’ mode due to the failure of batteries is hindering operation.  Hence, it was decided not to expect any more meaningful and reliable services from HAMSAT VO-52. On 21 July 2014, ISRO has decommissioned ‘HAMSAT-VO52′ officially.

HAMSAT VO-52 was designed for one year mission life, but lasted for almost 10 years. The satellite was designed to be maintenance-free, and autonomous. It was a test-bed for many new concepts such as a Bus Management Unit (BMU), lithium-ion based power system, automatic spin rate control and spin axis orientation control (SAOC) for maintaining the Satellite attitude without ground commanding. HAMSAT was known as “OSCAR-52” among Amateur HAM operators, and was popular internationally because of its high sensitivity receiver and strong transmitter.

Specifications

The satellite is spin stabilized. It spins at about 4 RPM.
UHF Uplink and VHF Downlink
Uplink transponder frequency: 435.250 MHz
Downlink transponder frequency: 145.900 MHz
Beacon frequencies: 145.860 MHz CW telemetry and 145.936 MHz unmodulated carrier
Transponder bandwidth: 60 kHz
Transmitter output power: 1 watt
Antennas: VHF and UHF turnstiles
Communication modes: CW, SSB, FM
Electrical power: Gallium Arsenide solar panels charging a Lithium Ion battery
Onboard computer: MAR 31750 processor in the spacecraft's electronic bus management unit for attitude control, telemetry, telecommand for ground control, sensor and actuator functions.

See also

Indian space program
List of Indian satellites
Amateur radio in India

External links
ISRO: HAMSAT
AMSAT link

References

Communications satellites of India
Amateur radio satellites
Amateur radio in India
Satellites orbiting Earth
Spacecraft launched in 2005
2005 in India